John Biddle may refer to:

John Biddle (Unitarian) (1615–1662), English nontrinitarian and Unitarian
John Biddle (Michigan politician) (1792–1859)
John Biddle (United States Army officer) (1859–1936)
John Biddle (yachting cinematographer) (1925–2008)